Charlie Victor André Gustafsson Ribenius (born 16 February 1992) is a Swedish actor best known for his leading role as Calle Svensson in the SVT series Vår tid är nu.

He is in a relationship with singer Amy Diamond.

Filmography
2001 – Mirakelpojken, 
2001 – Rederiet, - Ragnar Dahlén
2002 – Hjälp! Rånare! - Sebbe
2005 – Livet enligt Rosa - Robby T
2010 – Den fördömde - Roger
2012 – Dubbelliv - Niko
2014 – Tjockare än vatten
2014 – Vikingshill - Markus
2017–2020 – Vår tid är nu - Carl "Calle" Svensson
2009 – Så olika
2009 – I taket lyser stjärnorna - Oscar
2004 – Falla vackert - Isak
2010 – Tusen gånger starkare - Viktor
2010 – En gång hjälte - Ludvig
2011- Stig Helmer Story
2013 – Gabriel Klint - Gabriel Klint
2013 – Julie
2013 – Tyskungen - Per Ringholm
2013 – 10 Guds siffror
2013 – Sitting Next to Zoe - Kai
2013 – IRL - Filip

References

External links 

Swedish actors
Living people
1992 births
21st-century Swedish male actors